Bloody Bones is a horror/mystery novel by American writer Laurell K. Hamilton, the fifth book in the Anita Blake: Vampire Hunter series.

Plot introduction 
Bloody Bones continues the adventures of Anita Blake.  This time, Anita travels to Branson, Missouri and is quickly enmeshed in a series of supernatural murders and disappearances that she and her vampire would-be lover,  Jean-Claude must resolve.  As with its predecessors, Bloody Bones blends elements of supernatural, hardboiled and police procedural fiction.

Explanation of the title
Within the book, "Bloody Bones" is the name of a restaurant that is operated by two of the principal characters in the novel, Magnus and Dorcas Bouvier.  Hamilton employed the practice of naming each novel after a fictional location within the story for most of the Anita Blake series.  In this case, the restaurant itself is named after a character in the novel, Rawhead and Bloody Bones, making the title somewhat eponymous.

Plot summary
Bloody Bones begins on Saint Patrick's Day, shortly after the events of the previous Anita Blake novel, The Lunatic Cafe.  Like the previous novels, the novel opens with Anita considering a possible job.  This time, her manager, Bert, is calculating a possible bid for a mass zombie raising in Branson, Missouri.  Bert explains that a law firm is soliciting bids to raise an entire graveyard in order to determine who owns a piece of land needed for a resort complex.  The graves are unmarked and may contain corpses at least 100 years old, Anita finds out later there are some that are much older than that, which will make the raising very difficult.  In Anita's opinion, she is the only person in the world who might be able to raise that many ancient unmarked graves without a human sacrifice.  She agrees to take the job, and takes Larry along to boost her powers, and as a training experience.  (She and Bert agree that although John Burke also has the power to make a good second, his pride is such that it's best that he not even learn that Anita took a job that he was not strong enough to take on his own).

Arriving in Branson, Anita meets Raymond Stirling, the lawyer in charge of the development project and his assistants, Lionel Bayard, Ms Harrison and Beau, and learns that Stirling is in a dispute with Magnus and Dorcas Bouvier, two siblings who claim to own the land at issue and refuse to sell.  If the corpses on the land confirm that it belongs to the Bouviers, Stirling's project will be unable to continue.
 
After reviewing the site and making plans to explore the site further that evening, Anita receives a call from Dolph.  Dolph asks Anita for advice on a crime scene back in St. Louis and also asks her to assist the local police with a nearby crime scene.  Anita and Larry drive to the scene and meet Sergeant Freemont, who appears to want to crack the case herself and resents their intrusion.  Anita inspects the murder victims—three teen-aged or younger boys cut apart with a blade.  Each of the boys' faces have been disfigured or removed, and Freemont reveals that a teenaged boy and girl were murdered earlier, with similar wounds.  Anita warns Freemont that in her opinion, the boys were cut apart by a sword wielded by something as fast and strong as a vampire, with enough mental power to hold two of the boys motionless while killing the third.  Larry is seriously shaken by viewing his first murder scene.
 
Anita and Larry then go to the Bouviers' restaurant, named "Bloody Bones," to investigate the land dispute and to get dinner.  There, they meet Magnus and Dorrie, each of whom is part-fey.  Magnus is using glamour to host a date night.  By touching the restaurant patrons, he makes them irresistibly attractive for one night, in return for drawing some power for himself.  After trying unsuccessfully to seduce Anita, Magnus is coy about why the Bouviers refuse to sell their land.  Magnus also admits to destroying several trees outside the restaurant while in a drunken rage, causing Anita to consider him as a suspect for the recent killings.
 
During dinner, Dolph pages Anita again, and asks her to assist on another possible local vampire crime.  Anita tells Dolph that Magnus is part-fey and a potential suspect, then Anita and Larry drive to the home of Mr. and Mrs. Quinlan.  There, they meet Sheriff David St. John, his wife Beth, Deputy Zack Coltraine, Mr. and Mrs. Quinlan, and their son Jeff.  Jeff's older sister, Ellie is lying in her bed, dead of a vampire bite.  Anita and Larry eventually deduce that her death was probably voluntary, and learn that Ellie's boyfriend Andy recently disappeared.  They guess that Ellie's boyfriend has recently been raised as a vampire and turned her as well, but Mr. Quinlan refuses to believe them and demands that Anita stake Ellie to prevent her from rising.  Anita asks him to wait twenty-four hours to "cool off" and promises to stake Ellie if her father demands it after that time.
 
After instructing the Quinlans to place the Host at each doorway to prevent any vampires from reentering the home, Anita explains that the vampire that turned Ellie probably has a resting place nearby, and that they may catch it if they attempt a nighttime hunt.  She heads out into the woods after it, together with Larry, Sheriff St. John, Deputy Coltraine, and two other police officers, Wallace and Granger.  During the hunt, Anita learns that Wallace was a survivor of a vampire attack and shows him her own scars in an effort to put him at ease. 
 
During the hunt, Anita and the others are ambushed by a pack of vampires.  In the fight, Anita kills two vampires, but Granger is bitten, Wallace's arm is broken, and Xavier kills Coltrain with a sword.  While the hunters regroup, Granger, now under vampire control, attempts to shoot Larry, and Anita is forced to kill him.  The group then hears screams from the Quinlan home, and St. John and Anita run for the house, leaving Larry and Wallace to bring up the rear.

When Anita gets to the house, Beth St. John is dead and Jeff has been taken.  (Apparently, Xavier was able to shapeshift and fit through a pet door).  Sheriff St. John kills a brown haired, female vampire.  Anita shoots at Xavier, but he's too fast to hit.

Later, Sergeant Freemont arrives at the scene.  She explains that after Dolph told her that Magnus was part fey, she went to arrest him.  Mangus used glamour to escape, and is now wanted for using magic on police officers during the course of his escape.  FBI agents Elwood and Bradford arrive and speak to Anita, who agrees to attempt to identify and contact the Master of the City.

Anita calls Jean-Claude for information.  Jean-Claude explains that he thinks he knows the vampire Anita saw, and that it is an "exotic" vampire of a sort concealed from humans.  Among other things, it is a pedophile.  Jean-Claude offers to come to Branson to set up a meeting with the Master of the City.  With Jeff Quinlan in the hands of a monster, Anita is forced to accept Jean-Claude's help.
 
With no way to pursue the Quinlan case, Anita and Larry return to the graveyard to "walk the graveyard" and attempt to sense the location and identities of the corpses in preparation for a later attempt to raise the dead.  Anita and Larry experiment with combining powers, and are surprised at the degree to which they are able to magnify each other's abilities.  However, their powers attract Magnus, who appears and insists that they not raise the dead in that graveyard.  Stirling orders Beau to shoot Magnus for trespassing, but Anita, realizing that Stirling intended the evening as a trap for Magnus, draws her own gun and buys Magnus time to escape.

Anita and Larry return to their hotel suite to find Jean-Claude and Jason.  Jean-Claude has flown in on his private jet, but it is now too late in the night to track down the Master before dawn.  Jean-Claude informs Anita of Xavier's name, then retires for the morning in her bed.  Jason visits with Anita and Larry, and challenges Anita for dominance.  Anita wins, of course, and figures out that Jean-Claude has ordered Jason to show his lycanthrope side in an effort to dissuade Anita from marrying Richard.  Jason acknowledges Anita as dominant and goes to bed.

Later that morning, Dorcas Bouvier bursts into Anita's hotel suite and demands to see Magnus.  After Dorcas bursts into the bedroom and sees Jean-Claude and Jason, she accepts that Anita has not fallen victim to Magnus's charms and explains why the Bouviers refuse to sell their land.  Centuries ago their ancestor, a member of the fey, emigrated to colonial North America with a more powerful fey, Rawhead and Bloody Bones trapped in a magic box.  While Rawhead was trapped, Bouvier was able to create a potion from its blood and increase his own powers, but eventually, Rawhead escaped and went on a murderous rampage.  After a pitched battle, Rawhead was sealed beneath the ground, and the Bouvier family has remained in Branson in order to prevent Rawhead from escaping.  Anita convinces Dorcas to take her to see the mound where Rawhead is trapped, and they agree to go to the mound the following day.

That evening, Jean-Claude prepares the group to meet Seraphina, the master of Branson.  He explains that his visit raises issues of vampire politics.  Although vampires' interactions with one another are somewhat constrained by the laws of the Vampire Council, conflicts are still possible, and he has negotiated a delicate truce with Seraphina.  Although the group must be prepared to fight, they may not strike the first blow.  Jean-Claude and Anita, accompanied by Larry and Jason, visit an apparently ruined and abandoned home, cloaked in magical shadow, and meet Ivy, Bruce, Kissa, Janos, Pallas and Bettina.

The Branson vampires  engage in a calculated plan to force Jean-Claude's party to break the truce.  Without offering violence to his group, they threaten to torture two young women, then sexually harass Jason.  Jean-Claude is forced to challenge Janos to a contest of power, which he begins to lose.  Ultimately, Anita escapes the trap by baiting Ivy into attacking her, allowing the group to use violence in their own defense.  In the ensuing battle, Larry kills Bruce, and Pallas and Bettina are first shot, then torn apart.  (However, because they are rotting vampires, they are almost impossible to kill.)  Anita is forced to give blood to save Jean-Claude's life.

Once Jean-Claude is stabilized, Magnus appears and offers to convey the group to see Seraphina under a flag of truce.  Seraphina toys with the group, but ultimately agrees that a murderous pedophile master vampire in her territory is a threat, and agrees to track down Xavier.  Jean-Claude is astounded that Seraphina has somehow become powerful enough to assert mastery over vampires as formidable as Janos.

The group returns to the hotel to clean up.  Anita learns more about Jean-Claude's history and momentarily surrenders to her lust and kisses Jean-Claude, but stops when he draws blood (though he claims it was by accident).  She stays with Jean-Claude as dawn comes and he "dies" for the day and is surprised at her growing sympathy towards him.  Anita then falls asleep herself and is visited in her dream by Seraphina, who promises to reunite Anita with her deceased mother if Anita agrees to serve Seraphina.  Anita wakes, and begins planning to kill Seraphina.

Anita and Larry meet up with Dorcas Bouvier, who takes them to the mound where Bloody Bones is imprisoned.  When they arrive, they surprise Magnus in the act of drinking Bloody Bones's blood, and Dorcas realizes that Magnus has been using Bloody Bones to boost his power for years.  Anita proposes that instead of raising the entire Bouvier graveyard, she raise just enough zombies to confirm the Bouviers' claim to the land and prevent Stirling from digging up the graveyard and freeing Bloody Bones.
 
That evening, accompanied by Stirling, Bayard, and Harrison, Anita and Larry combine their powers to animate a few of the ancient corpses in the Bouvier graveyard.  Just before Anita completes the circle of blood needed to activate their power, she feels Bloody Bones stir and realizes that raising even a few zombies will free the monster.  She stops, but Ivy flies from the darkness and attacks.  Anita kills Ivy in self-defense, but Ivy's blood falls on the remaining span of the circle, closing the loop and activating her power.  Similar to Anita's inadvertent human sacrifices in The Laughing Corpse, Ivy's death supercharges Anita's power, forcing her to animate every corpse in the graveyard.

At that point, Stirling and Harrison draw guns, and Stirling shoots Bayard.  Apparently, Seraphina and Bloody Bones promised Stirling the land in return for Bloody Bones's freedom, and Stirling had planned on killing Anita once she raised  the Bouviers and freed the fey.  Anita orders the zombies to attack Stirling and Harrison and incapacitates them both.  While she considers whether to kill them, Janos arrives with a newly risen Ellie, accompanied by Bettina, Pallas, Kissa, Xavier and their hostage, Jeff Quinlan.  The vampires feed on and kill Stirling and Harrison, and inform Anita that Xavier has been serving Seraphina since her arrival in Branson.

Seraphina's vampires fly away, and Anita goes to confront them and attempt rescue Jeff, with the help of Jean-Claude, Larry, and Jason.  Bloody Bones arrives and demands its freedom, but Seraphina breaks her word to the fey and announces her intent to continue drinking its power forever.  With her oath broken, Larry and Anita are able to break her spell over Bloody Bones, and it draws a sword and impales Seraphina.  Bloody Bones admits to Anita that it has been able to manifest its form as a result of Magnus's interference, and that it killed the teenagers for being bad children.  Realizing that Bloody Bones is mortal as long as it continues to share power with Magnus, Anita shoots the boggle, slowing it down long enough for Xavier to kill it with a greatsword forged of cold iron.  Anita infers that Xavier is a fey raised as a vampire, although Xavier denies it.  Seraphina regains control, and decides that Anita's blood might make an acceptable second choice for Bloody Bones's.  In return for Anita surrendering herself, Seraphina agrees to let the others go.
 
The next morning, Anita wakes up next to Seraphina in her coffin.  She forces her way out and learns that the coffins of Seraphina's vampires have been moved to the Bloody Bones bar and grill.  (Ellie does not have a coffin and is sleeping on the floor.)  Anita tries to escape, but Magnus stops her.  In the course of the fight, Anita drips some of her blood on Ellie and realizes that she can raise Ellie as if she were a zombie.  She does so and orders Ellie to hold Magnus while she makes her escape.  With Ellie clinging to his waist, Magnus chases Anita outside and is burned to death when Ellie burns in the sunlight.
 
Anita contacts Agent Bradford and tells him where the vampires are resting.  With Anita, Larry and the local authorities, Bradford douses the Bloody Bones restaurant with gasoline and prepares to set it on fire.  Anita feels Seraphina in her mind and forces the agents to handcuff her and lock her in a car so that Seraphina cannot use her control over Anita to interfere.  As the fire consumes all of the vampires inside, including the now-dead Jeff Quinlan, Seraphina forces Anita to relive the death of her own mother, renewing her earlier trauma.
 
In the epilogue, Anita explains that Dorcas, now free of the family curse, sold the Bouvier land and left Branson with her children, that the Quinlans are suing Animators, Inc. because of Anita's refusal to stake Ellie when asked, and that Anita herself is continuing her life in St. Louis, notwithstanding the fresh emotional wounds.

Characters

Major characters
Bloody Bones features the following major characters.
 Anita Blake: In Bloody Bones, Anita further develops her role as Larry's mentor, and is forced to ask Jean-Claude for substantial help for the first time.  She also relives the trauma of her mother's death.  According to Hamilton's notes in the afterword, writing the novel was also traumatic for Hamilton herself, because it required Hamilton to reexperience her own mother's death, the event that served as a model for Anita's childhood experience).
 Jean-Claude: Jean-Claude's admission that the Vampire Council has divided his territory, together with his conflict with Serephina and Janos, further underscores the difficulty he is having as the newly installed Master of the City, a conflict that appear in several of the early novels.  In addition, the appearance of vampires from Jean-Claude's past allows Anita to learn more about the circumstances that have made him into the vampire she knows.
 Richard Zeeman: Richard appears only in the beginning of the novel, when Anita visits to tell him that she's going out of town, and is mentioned in the epilogue.

Other characters
 Recurring characters in Bloody Bones include: 
 Anita's co-workers Bert Vaughn and Larry Kirkland; 
 police officer Dolph Storr; and 
 Jean-Claude's pomme de sang Jason Schuyler.
 Non-recurring characters in Bloody Bones include:
 Raymond Stirling;
 Lionel Bayard;
 Ms Harrison;
 Mr and Mrs Quinlan, and their children Ellie and Jeff;
 Dorcas Bouvier;
 Sergeant Freemont;
 Beau;
 Lisa and her unnamed friend, two college girls who agree to visit Seraphina's lair;
 David St. John
 Officer Wallace, a police officer that accompanies Anita on her vampire hunt;
 Federal agents Elwood and Bradford (Although Bradford does appear in Obsidian Butterfly and at least one other subsequent novel.)
 The death toll in Bloody Bones includes:
 Three unnamed murdered teenaged boys, killed by Bloody Bones;
 A teenaged boyfriend and girlfriend, killed before the novel begins by Bloody Bones;
 Andy, presumably killed by Anita in an early firefight;
 Deputy Zack Coltrain nearly decapitated by a vampire in an early firefight;
 Officer Granger, killed by Anita to prevent him from shooting Larry.
 Beth St. John, killed by an unnamed brown haired female vampire.
 The brown haired female vampire herself, killed by Beth's husband, David St. John;
 Bruce, shot by Larry at Seraphina's house
 Lionel Bayard, shot by Stirling
 Ivy, killed by Anita in self-defense;
 Ms Harrison, was severely injured after Anita ordered a zombie to attack her, later drained by Ellie and Xavier
 Raymond Stirling, drained by Pallas and Bettina
 Rawhead and Bloody Bones, killed by Anita and Xavier;
 Ellie, turned into a vampire by Andy and killed when Magnus dragged her into sunlight;
Magnus Bouvier, burned to death when Anita forced Ellie to hold onto his waist as he ran out into sunlight;
 Seraphina, Xavier, Janos, Pallas, Bettina, (presumably)  Kissa, and Jeff Quinlan, burned when authorities set fire to the Bloody Bones.
 

1996 American novels
Anita Blake: Vampire Hunter novels
Low fantasy novels
Urban fantasy novels
Novels set in St. Louis
Ace Books books